Madrugada  is a 1957 Spanish film directed by Antonio Roman and starring Argentine actress Zully Moreno.

Cast

References

External links
 

1957 films
1950s Spanish-language films
Argentine black-and-white films
1950s Argentine films